Harilyn Rousso (born May 21, 1946) is an American disabled rights activist, psychotherapist, artist, and feminist. In 2003 she was designated a Women's History Month Honoree by the National Women's History Project.

Early life and education

Harilyn Rousso was born in 1946 with cerebral palsy. She decided to go into psychotherapy and was discouraged by her professors who believed that a woman with cerebral palsy could not succeed in her career, thus they refused to teach her. She would move on to another training facility and eventually obtained her license. Rousso would also graduate from Brandeis University with a degree in economics.

Professional career

Rousso's main work focuses on three themes: psychotherapy, disabled women and fine art. After graduation from college she worked at the Office of Economic Opportunity in Washington, D.C. which helped trigger her interest in working with people. In the 1980s Rousso began the Networking Project for Disabled Women and Girls at the New York City YWCA. Later that decade she would publish Disabled, Female, and Proud: Stories of Ten Women with Disabilities and make the film Positive Images: Portraits of Women with Disabilities. As a disabled rights activist worked for the United Nations Fourth International Conference on Women and used that experience to foster Beijing +5, a series of trainings for disabled women. She has also served on the board of Ms. magazine, the Center for Women Policy Studies, the Sister Fund, among others. In 2000 she was the recipient of the Jessie Bernard Wise Women Award.

Since 1997 she has also produced fine art as a way to enhance visibility and awareness about disability.

Further reading

Rousso, Harilyn. Disabled, Female, and Proud: Stories of Ten Women with Disabilities. Bergin & Garvey Paperback (1993). 
Rousso, Harilyn. Don't Call Me Inspirational: A Disabled Feminist Talks Back. Philadelphia, PA: Temple University Press. (2013)
Rousso, Harilyn and Michael L. Wehmeyer. Double Jeopardy: Addressing Gender Equity in Special Education Supports and Services. Albany: SUNY Press (2001). 
Rousso, Harilyn. Gender matters : training for educators working with students with disabilities. Ann Arbor: University of Michigan Library (2002).

References

External links
Harilyn Rousso from the Disability Rights and Independent Living Movement.
A collection of Rousso's art at ducts.

1946 births
American feminists
American people with disabilities
American psychotherapists
Brandeis University alumni
American disability rights activists
People with cerebral palsy
Living people
Scientists with disabilities